Hellenion has been used to refer to:

Hellenion (Naucratis), an Ancient Greek sanctuary in Naucratis of Egypt (founded in the 6th century BC)
Hellenion (Sparta), a temple of Zeus Sellanios in Sparta
Hellenion (Cairo), a short-lived association founded in early 1900s by the Greek community of Egypt.
Hellenion, an active Hellenic Neopagan organization in the United States; founded in 2000.

References

Set index articles